Mueang Phatthalung is the capital district (amphoe mueang) of Phatthalung province, southern Thailand.

Geography 
Neighboring districts are (from the south clockwise) Khao Chaison, Kong Ra, Srinagarindra, and Khuan Khanun of Phatthalung Province, and Ranot and Krasae Sin of Songkhla province.

The eastern part of the district is at the shore of the Thale Luang, the northern part of Songkhla Lake.

History 
The district Klang Mueang (กลางเมือง) was one of the three original districts established in 1896. In 1917 it was renamed Lampam (ลำปำ), following the name of the tambon housing the district administration. The administration was moved to tambon Khuha Sawan in 1924. In 1938 the district was renamed Mueang Phatthalung.

Administration 
The district is divided into 14 sub-districts (tambons), which are further subdivided into 144 villages (mubans). The town (thesaban mueang) Phatthalung covers tambon Khuhu Sawan, and small parts of tambons Khao Chiak, Tha Miram, Prang Mu, Lampam, Tamnan, and Khuan Maphrao. There are a further 13 tambon administrative organizations (TAO).

Missing numbers are tambon which now form Srinagarindra District.

References 

Districts of Phatthalung province